Grant Township is the name of four townships in the U.S. state of Indiana:

 Grant Township, Benton County, Indiana
 Grant Township, DeKalb County, Indiana
 Grant Township, Greene County, Indiana
 Grant Township, Newton County, Indiana

Indiana township disambiguation pages